Paramacrolobium is a genus of flowering plants in the family Fabaceae. It belongs to the subfamily Detarioideae. It contains a single species, Paramacrolobium coeruleum.

The species is native to portions of western, central, and eastern Africa, from Guinea in the west to Kenya and Tanzania in the east, and south to Angola.

References

Detarioideae
Monotypic Fabaceae genera
Afrotropical realm flora